Ruthenium(III) nitrate is an inorganic compound, a salt of ruthenium and nitric acid with the chemical formula Ru(NO3)3.

Physical properties
Ruthenium(III) nitrate dissolves in water. It forms a crystalline hydrate with the composition  in the form of yellow crystals.

Chemical properties

Applications
Ruthenium(III) nitrate is used for the manufacture of ruthenium-carbon catalysts.

References

Ruthenium(III) compounds
Nitrates